George John (c. 1883 – January 14, 1944) was a West Indian fast bowler.

George John was a very fast bowler in his prime and could cut the ball into the batsmen. He toured England with West Indies side in 1923 but by then was past his best. He claimed 90 wickets at 14.68 in all matches, 49 of them at 19.51 in first class matches. Against Glamorgan he took 10 for 147 and at Scarborough, with George Francis, reduced a near Test quality HDG Leveson Gower's XI to 19 for 6 as they were chasing 28 to win in the second innings. John took 5 for 54 for Trinidad against MCC in 1925-26 when he was over forty years of age.

C. L. R. James who often played against him has left a picture of what John the bowler looked like :

He was just the right height, about five foot ten, with a chest, shoulders and legs on him all power and proportion... He was one of those rare fast bowlers who proposed to defeat you first of all by pace and sheer pace. He ran about fifteen yards, a quick step or two first, a long loping stride that increased until near the crease he leapt into the air and delivered, his arm high...Thunderbolts they were.

In June 1988 John was celebrated on the 30c Trinidad and Tobago stamp alongside the Barbados Cricket Buckle. He was the father of the playwright and actor Errol John.

Notes

References
 C. L. R. James, Beyond a Boundary, Duke University Press (1998)
 Wisden Obituary

Pre-1928 West Indies cricketers
Trinidad and Tobago cricketers
1880s births
1944 deaths
Saint Vincent and the Grenadines cricketers
Saint Vincent and the Grenadines emigrants to Trinidad and Tobago